Jody Chiang or Jiang Hui, born Jiang Shuhui, is a Taiwanese popular singer. She began recording in the 1980s and retired in 2015, having released 60 albums. Her trademark ballads and folk songs are typically sung in Taiwanese. Her role in Taiwan's popular music scene is often compared to that of Teresa Teng. She is the older sister of Chiang Shu-na.

Early career
Chiang's mother was a food vendor and her father a glove puppeteer. She grew up in a poor family and quit school at the age of ten to begin singing at warehouses and bars in Beitou, Taipei. She started her commercial singing career in 1981 with a Japanese language album, and was signed to Country Records two years later. Chiang held her first concert in April 2008. The singer has released 60 albums and won thirteen Golden Melody Awards over her career. Chiang is known as "Second Sister" amongst her fans, because she is the second eldest of four siblings. Chris Hung and Chiang are known as the King and Queen of Taiwanese pop.

Farewell concerts 
On 2 January 2015, Chiang announced that she would end her singing career that year with 16 farewell concerts between July and September in Taiwan. Tickets to her final performances sold out quickly. The concert promoter, Kuang Hong Arts Management, faced protests by Chiang's fans and eventually announced nine additional performances only to see those tickets sell out in thirty minutes. The first farewell concert was staged at Taipei Arena on 27 July. The final concert of Chiang's career took place at Kaohsiung Arena on 13 September, and featured a retirement ceremony in which she locked a microphone in a box and threw the key into the crowd. The concerts held were recorded and sold as a DVD, released in October 2016.

Personal life
Chiang is the second eldest of four siblings, three sisters and one brother. In 2009, she was reported to be chased for large amounts of debt due to her eldest sister's gambling problem. Chiang's younger sister Chiang Shu-na is also a singer.

References

1961 births
Living people
Taiwanese Buddhists
Taiwanese Hokkien pop singers
Taiwanese people of Hoklo descent
People from Chiayi County
20th-century Taiwanese women singers
21st-century Taiwanese women singers
Japanese-language singers